Conesus Lake is a hamlet and census-designated place (CDP) in Livingston County, New York, United States. Its population was 2,584 as of the 2010 census. The community is located in the towns of Geneseo, Livonia, Groveland, and Conesus and covers Conesus Lake, the westernmost of New York's Finger Lakes, and nearly all of the lake's shoreline communities.

Geography
It is bordered to the north by the hamlet of Lakeville at the lake's outlet in the town of Livonia.

New York State Route 256 (West Lake Road) follows the western shore of the lake, and East Lake Road runs along the eastern side.

Demographics

References

Hamlets in Livingston County, New York
Hamlets in New York (state)
Census-designated places in Livingston County, New York
Census-designated places in New York (state)